John Coyne (July 21, 1836 – November 16, 1873) was a Canadian barrister, and Peel County's first representative in the Ontario Legislature.

A native of Toronto Township, the son of Mr. and Mrs. Edward Coyne, he received his education in Brampton at Brampton Public School. He was educated as a lawyer, and called to the Bar of Upper Canada in 1864. Coyne also served as reeve of Brampton.

Entering provincial politics in 1867, as a Conservative, he beat out Liberal candidate Robert Smith by just 46 votes (1118 to 1072). The number 1118 had a strange, but merely coincidental, attraction to him, as proved by the next election in 1871. Posed against Chinguacousy's T. O. Bowles, he won again with 1118 votes, against 1059 Liberal nods.

Coyne married Mary Catherine Scott, the youngest daughter of Brampton resident John Scott, in October 1867.

He died due to a short illness in 1873, after serving only two years of his second term.

External links 

The Canadian parliamentary companion and annual register, 1873, HJ Morgan
The Canadian parliamentary companion and annual register, 1874, HJ Morgan

1836 births
1873 deaths
People from Brampton
Progressive Conservative Party of Ontario MPPs
Pre-Confederation Ontario people